Redlands is a city in San Bernardino County, California, United States. As of the 2020 census, the city had a population of 73,168, up from 68,747 at the 2010 census.

History 
The area now occupied by Redlands was originally part of the territory of the Morongo and Aguas Calientes tribes of Cahuilla people. Explorations such as those of Pedro Fages and Francisco Garcés sought to extend Catholic influence to the indigenous people and the dominion of the Spanish crown into the area in the 1770s. The Tongva village of Kaawchama, located just to the west of present-day Redlands, was visited by Fr. Francisco Dumetz in 1810, and was the reason the site was chosen for a mission outpost. Dumetz reached the village on May 20, the feast day of Saint Bernardino of Siena, and thus named the region the San Bernardino Valley. The Franciscan friars from Mission San Gabriel established the San Bernardino Asistencia in 1819 and embarked on the usual program of training the native tribes to raise crops and encouraging permanent settlements. By 1820, a ditch, known as a zanja, was dug by native slave labor for the friars from Mill Creek to the Asistencia. In 1822, word of the Mexican triumph in the War of Independence reached the inland area, and lands previously claimed by Spain passed to the custody of the Mexican government.

In 1842, the Lugo family bought the Rancho San Bernardino Mexican land grant and this became the first fixed settler civilization in the area. The area northwest of current Redlands, astride the Santa Ana River, would become known as Lugonia. In 1851, the area received its first Anglo inhabitants in the form of several hundred Mormon pioneers, who purchased the entire Rancho San Bernardino, founded nearby San Bernardino, and established a prosperous farming community watered by the many lakes and streams of the San Bernardino Mountains. The Mormon community left wholesale in 1857, recalled to Utah by Brigham Young during the tensions with the federal government that ultimately led to the brief Utah War. Benjamin Barton purchased  from the Latter-Day Saints and planted extensive vineyards and built a winery.

"The first settler on the site of the present Redlands is recorded to have erected a hut at the corner of what is now Cajon St. and Cypress Ave.; he was a sheep herder, and the year, 1865," reported Ira L. Swett in "Tractions of the Orange Empire." Lugonia attracted settlers including, Barry Roberts in 1869, followed a year later by the Craw and Glover families. "The first school teacher in Lugonia, George W. Beattie, arrived in 1874—shortly followed by the town's first negro settler, Israel Beal."

Railroads
In the 1880s, the arrival of the Southern Pacific and Atchison, Topeka and Santa Fe Railroads, connecting Southern California to San Francisco and Salt Lake triggered a land boom, with speculators such as John W. North flooding the area now known as the Inland Empire.  North and others saw the area, with its hot, dry climate and ready access to water as an ideal center for citrus production.  The city of Redlands was soon established by Frank E. Brown, a civil engineer, and E. G. Judson, a New York stock broker, to provide a center (along with North's nearby settlement at Riverside) for the burgeoning citrus industry. They named their city "Redlands" after the color of the adobe soil. So large had the area grown by 1888 that it was decided to incorporate. "A red-letter day in the Annals of Redlands," pronounced Scipio Craig, editor of The Citrograph newspaper, of the November 26 incorporation. The original community of Lugonia was absorbed at this time. The newspaper was first published in July 1887 by The Citrograph Printing Company, which remains in 2017 as both Redlands' oldest business and the longest-operating printing company in California. E. G. Judson served as the first mayor of Redlands.

The Redlands Street Railway Company was incorporated on March 22, 1888, acquiring on June 5 a franchise from the San Bernardino County Supervisors dating to December 1887, conveying the right to construct, operate and maintain for a term of 50 years a line of street railways in Redlands, Terracina and vicinity. The initial operations began in June 1889 with a single-track line operating two-mule-team cars, the first street railway company of several to provide service to the community. Electrification and new rails replaced mules in 1899, with electrical operation beginning in December. Most Redlands street railways would pass to the San Bernardino Valley Traction Company in a consolidation on June 3, 1903, and thence to the Pacific Electric in the "Great Merger" of Huntington properties under new ownership by the Southern Pacific Transportation Company on February 8, 1911. Henry E. Huntington, nephew of late Southern Pacific president Collis P. Huntington, had gained control of the  streetcar line of the Redlands Central Railway Company in 1908.

The Pacific Electric Railway (PE) completed an interurban connection between Los Angeles and San Bernardino in 1914, providing a convenient, speedy connection to the fast-growing city of Los Angeles and its new port at San Pedro, bringing greater prosperity to the town and a new role as a vacation destination for wealthy Angelenos. Redlands was the eastern terminus of the "Big Red Car" system. At its peak, PE operated five local routes in Redlands, with streetcars running to Smiley Heights and on Orange, Olive, and Citrus Avenues. The Smiley Heights line was abandoned at this time, as well. Bus service operated by the Motor Transit Company, a subsidiary of Pacific Electric, began on July 20. This also affected mail delivery in Redlands as "Approximately 80 percent of our mail from all directions arrives on the 5 a.m. electric car," explained Postmaster James B. Stone. "This dispatch is sorted and morning deliveries started by 8:30 a.m. on most routes. The post office department has temporarily arranged for this mail to be brought in by the Santa Fe train at 6:05 a.m. As this arrival is an hour later, our service will be one hour later." The abandoned Pacific Electric La Quinta trestle over the Santa Ana River stood immediately south of San Bernardino International Airport into the 2010s but was removed when an Amazon facility was built adjacent to the site.

Electricity
"History was made in the electrical industry July 27, 1892, when a franchise was granted to the Electric Light & Power Co., which was incorporated Oct. 6 and began building a powerhouse in Mill Creek canyon. Thus the groundwork was laid for the world's first (three)-phase transmission line, which brought electricity to Redlands and later became a unit in the Southern California Edison Co." The 250 kilowatt AC Mill Creek No. 1 Hydroelectric Plant was designed by Almirian Decker. Electric arc lamps were first illuminated over Redlands streets on August 5, 1893. George B. Ellis, one of seven men who spearheaded the undertaking, is largely credited with originating the plan.

"The first line was extended from the Mill Creek powerhouse to East Citrus avenue, thence to Redlands and to Mr. Ellis' Terracina hotel. By September the company was advertising power for sale to the public. The firm boasted of ability to supply current enough for 55 arc lamps, and 1,500 homes." Engineer O. H. Ensign was "largely responsible for the success of the undertaking." When gas lighting became available in Redlands in 1900, many homes already had electricity.

"The same group of men in 1894 organized the Southern California Power Co. Later it was merged with the Edison Electric Co., of Los Angeles, a forerunner of the Southern California Edison Co."

Citrus
In the spring of 1882, Mr. E. J. Waite of Wisconsin planted the first orange grove in the city. For almost 75 years, the city was the center of the largest navel orange-producing region in the world. The city produced more than 4,200 railcars of navel oranges and 1,300 cars of Valencia oranges during the 1937–38 growing season. During the 1930s and 1940s, labor activists campaigned in the canneries and packing houses for union representation and higher wages. The United Cannery, Agricultural, Packing, and Allied Workers of America (UCAPAWA) won 13 National Labor Relations Board representation elections in the Riverside-Redlands area in 1943. In 1945, the first annual Orange Queen Ball at the Redlands City Auditorium was held to raise funds for the union.

The citrus industry declined in the area as more agricultural areas were replaced by subdivisions, and all three citrus packing houses (two in downtown and one on San Bernardino Avenue) had closed by the end of the 1900s.

Community
At the turn of the 20th century, Redlands was the "Palm Springs" of the next century, with roses being planted along many city thoroughfares. Some of these plantings would survive as wild thickets into the 1970s, especially adjacent to orange groves where property management was lax. Washingtonia palms (Washingtonia robusta) were planted along many main avenues. So beautifully kept was the area, with the dramatic mountain backdrops, that for several years the Santa Fe Railroad operated excursion trains along the loop that passed through the orange groves of Redlands and Mentone, across the Santa Ana River, and back into San Bernardino via East Highlands, Highlands and Patton, and advertised as the "Kite Route" due to its multi-sided alignment. The trestle over "the Wash" north of Mentone was carried away during a flood in March 1938 and never replaced, the line being truncated there. The Southern Pacific branch line from the San Timoteo Canyon to Crafton was abandoned after the downtown packing house business died. A thru-truss bridge over the Zanja (locally pronounced "san-kee") exists today, abandoned in place. Burlington Northern Santa Fe, result of the AT&SF-Burlington Northern merger, applied to abandon its San Bernardino-connected branch line east of downtown Redlands in 2007, the last shippers at Crafton and Mentone having ceased operations. A move was made by transit activists beginning in the 1990s to have this branch revitalized as part of the Southern California transit districts, but it came to nothing for many years.  In 2019, (re)construction began on the branch from San Bernardino to end-of-track on the eastern side of town adjacent to the campus of the University of Redlands. When complete, the line will feature 5 stations with mostly local service to and from the San Bernardino Transit Center.

The city has been visited by three U.S. Presidents: William McKinley was the first in 1901, followed by Theodore Roosevelt in 1903 and William Howard Taft in 1909. Local landmarks include the A.K. Smiley Public Library, a Moorish-style library built in 1898, and the Redlands Bowl, built in 1930 and home of the oldest continuously free outdoor concert series in the United States. Located behind the Smiley Library is the Lincoln Shrine, the only memorial honoring the "Great Emancipator", the sixteenth president Abraham Lincoln, west of the Mississippi River. Famous homes include "America's Favorite Victorian," the Morey Mansion, on Terracina Boulevard, and the Kimberly Crest House and Gardens, a home museum featured on the PBS series "America's Castles." Named after the family that purchased the house, the owners of Kimberly-Clark (makers of paper goods and Kleenex), it is a beautiful mansion set high on a hill overlooking the whole valley. Redlands is still regarded as the "Jewel of the Inland Empire."

In the mid-late 20th Century, Redlands was home to various light manufacturing firms, and became a bedroom community for the military personnel and contractor employees of the aerospace industry that supported missions at Norton Air Force Base, as well as the Lockheed Propulsion Company plant in Mentone. In 1989, Norton Air Force Base was placed on the Department of Defense closure list. Norton Air Force Base closed in 1994-1995 and the population dropped in the area, with a mild local economic recession occurring due to the closure in the area. The former Air Force Base is now the home of the San Bernardino International Airport and a variety of other business concerns also utilize the space.

Geography

Climate
The climate in this area is described by the Köppen Climate Classification System as  "dry-summer subtropical"  often referred to as "Mediterranean" and abbreviated as Csa.

The data below were compiled from 1898 through 2015, accessed via the Western Regional Climate Center.

Demographics

2010
The 2010 United States Census reported that Redlands had a population of 68,747. The racial makeup of Redlands was 47,452 (69.0%) White (54.0% Non-Hispanic White), 3,564 (5.2%) African American, 625 (0.9%) Native American, 5,216 (7.6%) Asian, 235 (0.3%) Pacific Islander, 8,266 (12.0%) from other races, and 3,389 (4.9%) from two or more races. Hispanic or Latino of any race were 20,810 persons (30.3%).

The Census reported that 66,379 people (96.6% of the population) lived in households, 1,856 (2.7%) lived in non-institutionalized group quarters, and 512 (0.7%) were institutionalized.

There were 24,764 households, out of which 8,598 (34.7%) had children under the age of 18 living in them, 12,374 (50.0%) were opposite-sex married couples living together, 3,397 (13.7%) had a female householder with no husband present, 1,291 (5.2%) had a male householder with no wife present.  There were 1,255 (5.1%) unmarried opposite-sex partnerships, and 164 (0.7%) same-sex married couples or partnerships. 6,083 households (24.6%) were made up of individuals, and 2,198 (8.9%) had someone living alone who was 65 years of age or older. The average household size was 2.68.  There were 17,062 families (68.9% of all households); the average family size was 3.21.

The population was spread out, with 16,273 people (23.7%) under the age of 18, 8,185 people (11.9%) aged 18 to 24, 17,381 people (25.3%) aged 25 to 44, 17,930 people (26.1%) aged 45 to 64, and 8,978 people (13.1%) who were 65 years of age or older.  The median age was 36.2 years. For every 100 females, there were 90.9 males.  For every 100 females age 18 and over, there were 87.3 males.

The homeowner vacancy rate was 2.2%; the rental vacancy rate was 7.9%.  41,102 people (59.8% of the population) lived in owner-occupied housing units and 25,277 people (36.8%) lived in rental housing units.

During 2009–2013, Redlands had a median household income of $66,835, with 12.5% of the population living below the federal poverty line.

2000
As of the census of 2000, there were 63,591 people, 23,593 households, and 16,019 families residing in the city. The population density was 1,793.1 inhabitants per square mile (692.2/km). The racial makeup of the city was 73.7% White, 4.3% African American, 0.9% Native American, 5.1% Asian, 0.2% Pacific Islander, 11.3% from other races, and 4.4% from two or more races. Hispanic or Latino of any race were 24.1% of the population.

There were 23,593 households, out of which 33.5% had children under the age of 18 living with them, 50.6% were married couples living together, 13.0% had a female householder with no husband present, and 32.1% were non-families. 26.0% of all households were made up of individuals, and 9.2% had someone living alone who was 65 years of age or older.  The average household size was 2.6 and the average family size was 3.2.

In the city, the population was spread out, with 26.2% under the age of 18, 10.7% from 18 to 24, 27.9% from 25 to 44, 22.7% from 45 to 64, and 12.6% who were 65 years of age or older.  The median age was 35 years. For every 100 females, there were 89.4 males.  For every 100 females age 18 and over, there were 85.4 males.

The median income for a household in the city was $58,155, and the median income for a family was $76,254. Males had a median income of $64,408 versus $52,122 for females. The per capita income for the city was $24,237.  About 2.7% of families and 1.5% of the population were below the poverty line, including 8.5% of those under age 18 and 5.2% of those age 65 or over.

The 2008 population estimated by the California Department of Finance was 71,807.

Economy

Major employers 
According to the city's 2021 Annual Comprehensive Financial Report, the top employers in the city are:

Arts and culture

Historic structures

National Register of Historic Places in Redlands: A. K. Smiley Public Library, Beverly Ranch (Fisk-Burgess house), Kimberly Crest, the Mill Creek Zanja, the Redlands Central Railway Company Car Barn, the Redlands Santa Fe Depot District, the Smiley Park Historic District, and the US Post Office—Redlands Main.
California Historical Landmarks in Redlands: A.K. Smiley Library (994), Kimberly Crest (1019), the San Bernardino de Sena Estancia (42), and the Zanja (43).  The Barton house has been nominated and is pending approval.
Redlands Heritage Awards: a list of numerous Victorian, Craftsman, etc. homes in Redlands.
The Barton School House, built in 1877, is the oldest building in Redlands. The historic elementary school closed down in the 1960s and deteriorated at its Nevada Street location. By early 2008, construction had become huge in the area surrounding it and the land the property sat on was purchased for development. Instead of destroying the building, the company paid to move it to Orange Avenue at The Grove School's farm campus. The building was moved in three pieces and has been renovated and remodeled. It is now owned and operated by The Grove School.

Edwards Mansion, built in 1890 by one of the founders of Redlands, Citrus grower James S. Edwards, this structure was originally used not as a family home but as a boarding house.  Mr. Edwards used standard plans and built the house on a small rise on Cajon St. from where the young orange groves he planted could be seen in every direction.  Eventually the Edwards family moved into the structure and occupied it continually until 1958 when Mrs. Edwards died.  Almost a decade later, Plymouth Village acquired the home and used it for their business offices until it was acquired by the Edwards Mansion complex in 1973 for one dollar.  The structure was moved to its current location off of Interstate 10 and restored to serve its current purpose as a popular wedding location.
Kimberly Crest House and Gardens, built in 1897 this French château-style home is preserved by the Kimberly-Shirk Association that was formed for that purpose. In 1905 J. Alfred Kimberly (co-founder of Kimberly-Clark) purchased this home for his family. His daughter, Mary Kimberly Shirk, lived in the home until her death in 1979. Before she passed the majority of the grounds were sold to the City of Redlands to become a botanical park, now known as Prospect Park. After her death, the home was left to "the people of Redlands" and the monies from the sale of the park were used to create the Kimberly-Shirk Association that cares for the home and provides tours within.
Morey Mansion, built in 1890 with the proceeds from the sale of Sarah Morey's citrus nursery.  There is no known architect of this beautiful structure.  David and Sarah Morey moved to Redlands in 1882 where David did carpentry work on many of the local structures and the Big Bear dam.  Using seeds from local growers, Sarah started a citrus nursery that became one of the foremost citrus nurseries in the area.  She eventually sold it and used half the proceeds to build their family home.  After the Morey family sold the house it was alternately a bed and breakfast and private residence and now serves both functions.  Located on the bluffs overlooking San Timoteo Canyon it is known for its commanding view.

Museums 

The Lincoln Shrine is a museum and research facility located in Smiley Park and dedicated to Abraham Lincoln and the American Civil War.
Redlands Historical Museum, located inside the A. K. Smiley Library on the grounds of Smiley Park in downtown Redlands. The Museum will refurbish the old 1940 City Hall, now used as the Redlands Police Department as their new Museum Center. The Heritage Center holds various pictures, pamphlets, maps, yearbooks, newspapers, manuscripts and books all relating to the rise of Redlands as a navel orange-producing mecca to the close-knit community it has become today.
Redlands Historical Glass Museum holds displays of American Glassware dating from the early 19th century to contemporary times. Displays include, glass from Heisey, Cambridge, Fenton Art Glass Company, Fostoria, and Sandwich factories as well as those that produced depression-era glassware. Items on display include candlesticks, compotes, milk glass, stems, bowls, historical plates, salts, kerosene lamps-and even several items from the estate of Liberace.
San Bernardino County Museum (SBCM), is a regional museum with exhibits and collections in cultural and natural history. Special exhibits, the Exploration Station live animal discovery center, extensive research collections, and public programs for adults, families, students, and children are all part of the museum experience. The SBCM also runs the San Bernardino de Sena Estancia.

Theater and music 

 Fox Event Center is located in downtown Redlands. The historic 1928 Fox Theatre offers dinner theater, film festivals, art shows, comedy shows, open mic nights, and concerts featuring different music genres including acoustic, blues, rock, jazz and classical.

 The LifeHouse Theater is an interdenominational (Judeo-Christian) community theater, founded in 1993.
 Redlands Bowl Summer Festival is the oldest continuously running music festival in Southern California, and the United States, where no admission is charged.  Performances feature symphony concerts, band, dance troupes, musical and opera.  It is located in Smiley Park in the Redlands Bowl amphitheatre.
 Redlands Chamber Music Society holds five performances of visiting artists at the Frederick Lowe Performance Hall each year.
 Redlands Footlighters is a volunteer community theater founded in 1945 that produces five shows each season.
 Redlands Symphony performs through the academic year at the University of Redlands and during the summer at the Redlands Bowl.
 Redlands Theatre Festival is a summer volunteer community theater festival founded in 1972 that produces around five plays in repertory that feature a different production each night which typically include:  a major Broadway musical, an Off-Broadway musical, a contemporary drama, a recent Broadway release and a period piece. The season begins the second week of July and continues through the third week of August.  Performances are held in the Avice Meeker Sewall Theater (an outdoor amphitheater) in Prospect Park.
 Redlands Shakespeare Festival occurs each May at the Redlands Bowl outdoor amphitheater in Smiley Park, and features full-scale repertory performances, a University Lecture Series, an Educational Workshop Series, Director's Insight Series, and other special events.

Local attractions
Citrus Plaza/Mountain Grove: a large open-air shopping center.
Hangar 24 Craft Brewery: Regional Craft Brewery with Tours and Tasting located at the Redlands Municipal Airport. 
Redlands Mall: a former indoor shopping mall, now closed (except for a CVS Pharmacy), scheduled for demolition, to be replaced by extending State Street west adding shops and residential housing.
Pharaoh's Adventure Park:  theme park, renamed Splash Kingdom Waterpark. The park was used by television filming, including a 2006 episode of C.S.I. Las Vegas featuring a rollercoaster accident. The park was demolished in 2020.

Local events 
Community July 4 includes picnic at Sylvan Park with more than 50 service and civic clubs, a parade, and the annual fireworks spectacular at Ted Runner Stadium with jet flyovers, skydivers, July 4 Band and fireworks – it is one of the largest Independence Day celebrations in California.
Lincoln Pilgrimage, held each February, attracts more than a thousand Scouts and other youth to honor the ideals and life of President Abraham Lincoln, and is coordinated by the Grayback District of the California Inland Empire Council, Boy Scouts of America.
Redlands Bicycle Classic, a cycling stage race, has been held in Redlands each spring (usually in March) since 1985.
Redlands Triathlon/Duathlon, your choice of a 5K run/10 mile bike/100 yard swim or a 5K run/10 mile bike/5K run-walk through Redlands held each February.
Run through Redlands, established in 1984, one of the biggest running events in the Inland Empire Area including a kinder-dash, 5K, 10K, and a half-marathon, is held each March.
Redlands Bowl Summer Music Festival, established in 1924, is an outdoor performing arts festival that runs every summer.

Parks and recreation
The city of Redlands owns and operates 24 public parks totaling more than :
Brookside Park: a  neighborhood park with picnic and playground facilities. (Brookside Avenue between Terracina Boulevard and Bellevue Avenue)
Caroline Park: a  nature park with trails and open space planted with native California plants and a water conservation garden. It houses a large variety of animals. Especially active near sundown. (Sunset Drive and Mariposa Drive)
Community Park: an  park with lighted baseball fields, tennis courts, picnic and playground facilities. (San Bernardino Avenue and Church Street)
Crafton Park: a -neighborhood park with lighted soccer field, picnic and playground facilities. (Wabash Avenue and Independence Avenue)
Ed Hales Park: a  downtown park with picnic facilities. (State Street and Fifth Street)
Jennie Davis Park: a  neighborhood park with picnic and playground facilities. (Redlands Boulevard and New York Street)
Ford Park: a  park with two ponds for fishing, lighted tennis courts, dog park, picnic and playground facilities. (Redlands Boulevard and Ford Street)
Franklin Park: a  natural open space area. (Garden Street and Franklin Avenue)
Orange Park: 1 acre pocket park with orange groves and a playground facility. (Pennsylvania Ave. and Village St.)
Prospect Park: an  natural park with trails and picnic facilities. The park contains the Avice Meeker Sewall Theater, an outdoor amphitheater with seating for 407. (Cajon Street and Highland Avenue)
San Timoteo Canyon Nature Preserve: a  natural preserve facility. (San Timoteo Canyon Road and Alessandro Road)
Simonds Parkway: a  neighborhood park. (Garden Street and Rossmont Drive)
Smiley Park: a  park at the Redlands Civic Center. This park is home to A.K. Smiley Public Library, a facility listed on the National Register of Historic Places; the Lincoln Memorial Shrine, built in 1932, containing the largest collection of Abraham Lincoln memorabilia west of the Mississippi River; and the Redlands Bowl, an outdoor amphitheater with seating for approximately 4,000 where summer concerts are performed each Tuesday and Friday evening during July and August. (Eureka Street and Vine Street). The Lincoln Shrine is host to the annual Boy Scout Pilgrimage to the Lincoln Shrine.
Sylvan Park: a  park with softball field, horseshoe pits, skate park, volleyball area, group and individual picnic areas and playground facilities. (Colton Avenue and University Street)
Texonia Park: a  neighborhood park with lighted softball field, basketball courts, picnic and playground facilities. (Texas Street and Lugonia Avenue)
Redlands Sports Park: The  facility includes soccer fields, softball fields, group picnic facilities, playground and recreations elements. (Wabash Avenue and San Bernardino Avenue) by Redlands Municipal Airport

The Redlands Conservancy has established 10 city-approved trails:

Bluffs Trail
Caroline Park Trail
East Valley Corridor Bikeway
Garden-Mariposa Trail
Gold Hill/Panorama Point Trail
Oak Ridge and Oakmont Trails
Orange Blossom Rail Trail
Teddy's Trail
San Timoteo Creek Flood Control Trail
Sylvan Park Trail

Cemetery 
The Hillside Memorial Park Cemetery, established in 1886 as a private cemetery, was acquired by the city in 1918. Notable burials include actress Gloria Holden, television journalist Robert Pierpoint, author Charles Nordhoff. and merchant and diplomat, Henry L. Atherton.

Government

Federal
Redlands is represented in the United States Senate by Democrats Dianne Feinstein and Alex Padilla.

State

Municipal government
Redlands is a general law city that uses the council–manager form of government. All five members of the city council are elected at-large; however, the council has voted to switch to council districts beginning with the 2018 and 2020 elections (phased implementation).  The mayor and mayor-pro-tempore are not directly elected, but are chosen by the council.

 B - current mayor.
 italicized - Mayor Pro-Tem.

Education

Higher education

Public education
Redlands Unified School District

Gorman Learning Center (K-12 charter school)

Private education

Transportation
Coming east from Los Angeles and continuing toward Palm Springs, Interstate 10 bisects Redlands. A tempestuous political battle occurred in the 1950s when three routes for the new freeway were considered, one north of town through the Lugonia district - the Lugonia-Sand Canyon route, the center route through the city, and a southern alignment through San Timoteo Canyon, parallelling the Southern Pacific railroad tracks - the San Timoteo-Live Oak Canyon route. The central route was finalized in 1957 and Redlands Mayor Charles Parker cut the ceremonial ribbon to open the new interstate on August 28, 1962. 
State Route 210 (the Foothill Freeway) begins at Interstate 10 in Redlands, then heads west toward Pasadena and Los Angeles. The San Bernardino-based Omnitrans bus system which handles the bus service for the area serves Redlands.

Airports
Redlands Municipal Airport is a general aviation airport located on the Northeastern end of the city.
San Bernardino International Airport, the former Norton Air Force Base.

Rail

Arrow is a commuter rail service that operates from the University of Redlands to San Bernardino with several stops in Redlands — service began on October 24, 2022. The San Bernardino line of the Greater Los Angeles regional transportation system Metrolink additionally makes one daily round trip to Redlands–Downtown station.

Religion

A variety of religions have a presence in Redlands, including a number of Christian faiths, Judaism, and Islam. There is a Redlands Area Interfaith Council. Holy Name of Jesus Catholic Church has parishioners in two locations.

Redlands has a large Mormon and Seventh-day Adventist population each, nearby is the town of Loma Linda.

The Redlands California Temple is the 116th operating temple of the Church of Jesus Christ of Latter-day Saints (LDS Church) and one of four LDS temples in Southern California. The LDS Church also has multiple chapels in Redlands. It has the San Bernardino Mission and also another in Riverside.

Congregation Emanu El, formerly located in nearby San Bernardino, in 2013 dedicated its new building on Ford Street in Redlands. The Congregation claims to trace its history back to the 1850s.

Notable people

 Matt Andriese, professional baseball player for Boston Red Sox
 Ashley Argota, actress 
 Joan Baez, folk singer and songwriter
 Brian Billick, head coach of NFL's Baltimore Ravens 1999–2007, television commentator
 Harry Blackstone Jr., professional magician
 Hugh "Lumpy" Brannum, actor, Mr. Green Jeans on Captain Kangaroo show
 Tyler Chatwood, current MLB starting pitcher for the Chicago Cubs
 Barney Childs, composer
 Ryan Christenson, MLB player for four teams, minor-league manager
 Tyler Clary, born in Redlands, won men's 200-meter backstroke at 2012 London Olympics
 Jack Dangermond, founder of ESRI
 Landon Donovan, professional soccer player for Los Angeles Galaxy, US National Team and Club León.
 Skip Ewing, country music star
 James Fallows, journalist for The Atlantic Monthly
 Davey Faragher, musician with Elvis Costello
 John Mack Faragher, American historian and author
 Helen G. Fisk (1895–1986), vocational services executive
 Tommy Hanson, professional baseball player for Los Angeles Angels
 Johnny Hickman, musician, guitarist for Cracker
Antoinette Humphreys, librarian in Redlands, Merced County, Colusa County
 Brion James, actor in films such as Blade Runner and 48 Hrs.
 Patrick Johnson, professional football player Baltimore Ravens
 John Jorgenson, guitar virtuoso with Desert Rose Band, the Hellecasters, the John Jorgenson Quintet, and six-year member of Elton John's tour band; attended Moore Junior High, and Redlands High School
 James LeGros, actor
 Harlan Lewis, Award-winning botanist and UCLA Dean of Life Sciences 
 Jerry Lewis, former congressman, ranking member of the House Appropriations Committee
 Lil Xan, rapper
 David Lowery, musician, lead singer for Camper Van Beethoven and Cracker
 Greta N. Morris, former United States Ambassador to Republic of the Marshall Islands
 Doris Niles, dancer, choreographer
 Kye Palmer, trumpet player and studio musician
 DeWayne Patterson, football player
 Leah Pritchett, NHRA Top Fuel driver
 Eric Pierpoint, actor
 Dorothea Puente, serial killer
 Michael A. Rogers, author, futurist
 Benji Schwimmer, winner of second season of So You Think You Can Dance
 Lacey Schwimmer, professional dancer on Dancing with the Stars
 Stephen Shadegg, political consultant in Phoenix, Arizona, associated in particular with Barry Goldwater; reared in Redlands
 Mark R. Shepherd, Democratic Party activist and politician
 Naomi Smalls, drag queen and finalist on RuPaul's Drag Race Season 8
 J.D.B. Stillman, author and physician
 Dave Stockton, professional golfer, two-time PGA Championship winner
 Dan Straily (born 1988), starting pitcher in the Philadelphia Phillies organization
 Tim Tackett, martial artist
 Mark Teahen, Major League Baseball player 2005-11
 Joan Tewkesbury, film director
 The Tornadoes, surf rock band featured on Pulp Fiction soundtrack
 Brett Waterman, home preservationist and host of DIY Network's Restored
 Tom Wheeler, 31st Chairman of Federal Communications Commission
 Josh Whitesell, MLB player for Arizona Diamondbacks
 Brant Bjork, singer, songwriter, musician

In popular culture 
Jardien's Dream, a young adult novel published in October 2009, takes place in Redlands.
The Rocketeer – in the Disney movie version, the heroine, Jenny, hails from Redlands.
 According to the Los Angeles Times, the town in Tamara Thorne's horror novel Bad Things is based on Redlands.
 In Frank Zappa's song "San Ber'dino", the lyrics comment that the song "ain't talkin' about the Redlands, no no."
 The DIY Network show Restored focuses on the restoration of homes in and around the Redlands area.
 In BBC's Torchwood season 4 episode 5 "The Categories of Life," a woman in a TV interview "arrived [to LA] early from Redlands" to attend the Miracle Rally
 In HBO’s Barry season 3 episode 2 “limonada”, two characters joke about the distance and long driving time between Redlands to Los Angeles.

Sister cities

 Hino, Japan
 San Miguel de Allende, Mexico

See also

Greater Los Angeles Area
Inland Empire Metropolitan Area

References

External links

Redlands Chamber of Commerce

 
Cities in San Bernardino County, California
Populated places in San Bernardino County, California
Populated places on the Santa Ana River
Incorporated cities and towns in California
Populated places established in 1888
1888 establishments in California